Park Sukyung (born 1973) is a South Korean professor of mechanical engineering at KAIST with expertise in Biomechanics served as Science and Technology Advisor to President Moon Jae-in from 2020 to 2022.

Park is the youngest person appointed by Moon to a vice-ministerial post as well as the youngest senior member of the Office of the President.

Park was the first female professor to join the faculty of mechanical engineering at KAIST and the first student to graduate from Seoul Science High School in only two years.

Park is a member of the KAIST board of trustees. She was previously a senior researcher at the government-funded Korea Institute of Machinery and Materials and a member of the President's Advisory Council on Science and Technology.

Park holds three degrees in mechanical engineering - a bachelor's and master's from KAIST and a doctorate from the University of Michigan.

References 

KAIST alumni
Academic staff of KAIST
University of Michigan alumni
1973 births
Living people
South Korean government officials
South Korean women academics
South Korean academics
South Korean scientists
South Korean women scientists